Herzem Gusmão Pereira (2 June 1948 – 18 March 2021) was a Brazilian politician and journalist.

Biography
He served as Mayor of Vitória da Conquista and was a member of the Legislative Assembly of Bahia. 

He worked for Rádio Clube de Conquista and Rádio Brasil FM prior to his political career.

Pereira was diagnosed with COVID-19 7 December 2020 shortly after being re-elected as Mayor of Vitória da Conquista. He was then hospitalized and transferred to São Paulo, where he died on 18 March 2021 at the age of 72.

References

Members of the Legislative Assembly of Bahia
Brazilian Democratic Movement politicians
Brazilian radio journalists
1948 births
2021 deaths
Deaths from the COVID-19 pandemic in São Paulo (state)